The Rough Guide To Arabic Revolution is a world music compilation album originally released in 2013 featuring music relating to the contemporaneous Arab Spring revolutionary wave. Part of the World Music Network Rough Guides series, the album contains two discs: a compilation Disc One featuring protest songs ranging from traditional music to Arabic hip hop, and a "bonus" Disc Two highlighting Ramy Essam, whose song "Irhal" (Leave) is widely considered the anthem of the Egyptian Revolution.

Disc One features four Egyptian tracks, four Palestinian tracks, two Tunisian, and one each from Libya, Lebanon, and the UK. The album was compiled by Daniel Rosenberg, who also wrote the sleeve notes.  The compilation was produced by Phil Stanton, co-founder of the World Music Network.

Critical reception

The album was met with generally positive reviews. Tony Hillier of Australian music magazine Rhythms called it "one of the more intriguing recent compilations from the admirable World Music Network label." David Maine of PopMatters commended the producers for "expanding the bounds of its musical series in this fashion" and especially praised the hip hop as  "the best stuff here".

Track listing

Disc One

Disc Two
All tracks on Disc Two are performed by Ramy Essam.

References

External links
 

2013 compilation albums
Arabic Revolution